Saint-Michel-en-Brenne is a commune and town in the French department of Indre, administrative region of Centre-Val de Loire, France.

Geography
The town is located in the parc naturel régional de la Brenne.

Population

See also
Communes of the Indre department

References

Communes of Indre